Hakea laurina is shrub or small tree commonly known as kodjet or pin-cushion hakea and is endemic to Western Australia.  The Noongar name for the plant is kodjet or kojet. It has red and cream conspicuous globular flowers and lance shaped leaves.

Description
The inflorescence consists of 120-190 conspicuous  white, deep pink or red pin cushion shaped flowers in the leaf axils. The flower buds are enclosed in scale-like bracts. Flowering occurs from April to July. The leaves are simple, slightly blue green, flat, smooth, margins entire, lance or egg-shaped and taper to a blunt point at the tip. The leaves are

Taxonomy and naming
Hakea laurina was first formally described 1830 by Robert Brown and the description was published in Supplementum primum prodromi florae Novae Hollandiae. The specific epithet is derived from the Latin laurus with reference to the resemblance of the leaves to laurel.

Distribution
Pincushion hakea occurs in the sandplains of the coastal southwest of Australia, the northernmost range being Narrogin and extending east to Esperance. The habitat is often sandplains, sometimes occurring on sandy clay; most recorded specimens are in the southern districts of its botanical province.

Cultivation
The plant, which is propagated from seeds, is used in cultivation in the eastern states of Australia, and as a hedging or street plant in America and Italy.  Adaptable to a number of soil types, the plant is also tolerant of frost. The uses of this species include ornament and shading in public streets, wildlife habitat, windbreaks, and control of soil erosion.

In the language of flowers, Hakea laurina symbolises nobility and longevity.

References

External links

laurina
Eudicots of Western Australia
Ornamental trees
Trees of Mediterranean climate
Drought-tolerant trees
Trees of Australia